Alexander Dmitriyevich Udaltsov (– 25 September 1958) was a historian. Much of his writing concerns the medieval period in Western Europe, but he also wrote about the methodology of historical materialism, archeology and the ethnogenesis of the Slavs.

In 1908, he married the artist Nadezhda Andreyevna Prudkovskaya. She was known throughout her career as Nadezhda Udaltsova, although she divorced David and married Alexander Drevin in 1919.

He wrote about the Agrarian History of Carolingian Flanders criticising the views of the Austrian social and economic historian Alfons Dopsch. He argued that Dopsch over emphasised the presence of private land ownership and social inequality among pre-feudal German Clans.

Works
 "Происхождение славян" (Origin of the Slavs), Voprosy Istorii No. 7 1947 pp 95-100

References

1883 births
1958 deaths
Imperial Moscow University alumni
Historical materialism
Burials at Novodevichy Cemetery
Voprosy Istorii editors
Historians from the Russian Empire
Soviet historians